George Byng (1735 – 27 October 1789) of Wrotham Park in Middlesex (now in Hertfordshire), was a British politician who sat in the House of Commons from 1768 to 1784.

Origins
He was the eldest son of Robert Byng (1703-1740), Governor of Barbados, by his wife Elizabeth Forward, a daughter and co-heiress of Jonathan Forward. He was a grandson of Admiral George Byng, 1st Viscount Torrington (1663-1733) of Southill Park in Bedfordshire.

Career
He inherited the estate of Wrotham Park from his unmarried and childless uncle Admiral John Byng (1704-1757), famously court-martialled and shot in 1757 following the fall of Minorca. At the 1768 general election Byng was elected as a Member of Parliament for Wigan. He was returned unopposed for Wigan in 1774. He was returned unopposed as MP for Middlesex at the  1780 general election but was defeated in a contest in 1784.

Marriage and progeny
On 5 March 1761 Byng married Anne Conolly (died 1806), daughter of William James Conolly (d.1754) by his wife Lady Anne Wentworth, a daughter of Thomas Wentworth, 1st Earl of Strafford (1672–1739). William James Conolly was an Irish Member of Parliament and was the nephew and heir of William Conolly (1662-1729), of Castletown House, County Kildare, Speaker of the Irish House of Commons, reputed to be the wealthiest man in Ireland. By his wife he had progeny including:

George Byng (1764–1847), eldest son and heir, MP, of Wrotham Park and of Wentworth House, 5, St James's Square, London, built in 1748-51 by his maternal relative William Wentworth, 2nd Earl of Strafford (1722–1791). He married but left no children.
Field Marshal John Byng, 1st Earl of Strafford (1772-1860), 2nd son and heir to his childless brother.

Death
He died on 27 October 1789.

References

 Torrington, Viscount (GB, 1721)

1735 births
1789 deaths
Members of the Parliament of Great Britain for English constituencies
British MPs 1768–1774
British MPs 1774–1780
British MPs 1780–1784
British MPs 1784–1790